Rachel Saunders Plakon is an American politician serving as a member of the Florida House of Representatives for the 36th district. She assumed office on November 8, 2022.

Education 
Plakon earned a Bachelor of Arts degree in mass media communication and journalism from Oral Roberts University and a Master of Business Administration from Florida International University.

Career 
In 2001 and 2002, Plakon served as a community liaison and spokesperson for Governor Jeb Bush. She later worked as a real estate agent for Keller Williams Realty and land specialist for NAI Realvest. Since 2018, Plakon has been a member of the Florida Commission on the Status of Women. She also owns a real estate investment company.

References 

Living people
Republican Party members of the Florida House of Representatives
Women state legislators in Florida
Oral Roberts University alumni
Florida International University alumni
American real estate brokers
American real estate businesspeople
People from Lake Mary, Florida
1979 births